Baron Baden-Powell, of Gilwell in the County of Essex, is a title in the Peerage of the United Kingdom created in 1929 for Lieutenant-General Sir Robert Baden-Powell, 1st Baronet. He had been created baronet, of Bentley, in the Baronetage of the United Kingdom on 4 December 1922.

Barons Baden-Powell (1929–present)
Robert Stephenson Smyth Baden-Powell, 1st Baron Baden-Powell, 1st Baronet (1857–1941)
Arthur Robert Peter Baden-Powell, 2nd Baron Baden-Powell, 2nd Baronet (1913–1962)
Robert Crause Baden-Powell, 3rd Baron Baden-Powell, 3rd Baronet (1936–2019)
David Michael Baden-Powell, 4th Baron Baden-Powell, 4th Baronet (1940–present)

Baden-Powell Baronets, of Bentley (1922–present)
Sir Robert Stephenson Smyth Baden-Powell, 1st Baronet (1922–1941).

Arms

References

 
1929 establishments in the United Kingdom
Baronies in the Peerage of the United Kingdom
Noble titles created in 1929
Baden-Powell family